Wolf Run is a  long 2nd order tributary to Sugar Creek in Venango County, Pennsylvania.

Course
Wolf Run rises on the West Branch Two Mile Run divide about 1 mile south of Haslets Corners, Pennsylvania in Venango County.  Wolf Run then flows westerly to meet Sugar Creek about 0.25 miles east of McKenzie Corners, Pennsylvania in Venango County.

Watershed
Wolf Run drains  of area, receives about 44.4 in/year of precipitation, has a topographic wetness index of 434.12, and has an average water temperature of 8.11 °C.  The watershed is 78% forested.

See also 
 List of rivers of Pennsylvania
 List of tributaries of the Allegheny River

References

Additional Images

Rivers of Venango County, Pennsylvania
Rivers of Pennsylvania
Tributaries of the Allegheny River